e-gold was a digital gold currency operated by Gold & Silver Reserve Inc. (G&SR) that allowed users to open an account on their web site denominated in grams of gold, or other precious metals, and that let users make instant transfers of value ("spends") to other e-gold accounts. The e-gold system was launched in 1996 and had grown to five million accounts by 2009, when transfers were suspended due to legal issues. At its peak in 2006, e-gold was processing more than US$2 billion worth of transactions per year, on a monetary base of 71 million worth of gold (about 3.5 metric tons). e-gold Ltd. was incorporated in Nevis, Saint Kitts and Nevis with operations conducted out of Florida, USA.

Beginnings

e-gold was founded by oncologist Douglas Jackson and attorney Barry Downey in 1996.  The pair originally backed the services accounts with gold coins stored in a bank safe deposit box in Melbourne, Florida. By 1998, G&SR (the system operator) was an Affiliate Member of NACHA and a Full Member of NACHA's The Internet Council.

The company was launched two years before PayPal but did not manifest exponential growth until 2000. By 2004, there were over a million accounts. It was the first successful digital currency system to gain a widespread user base and merchant adoption, noted July 13, 1999 in the Financial Times as "the only electronic currency that has achieved critical mass on the web".

By the early 2000s, the capability of immediate settlement, as implemented by e-gold, was recognized as key to the emergence of systems for peer-to-peer transfers of digital rights such as "smart contracts".

Criminal abuse
e-gold was a target of financial malware and phishing scams by criminal syndicates and was used for illegal activities.

Hackers
Because it did not sufficiently verify the identity of account holders, e-gold began to suffer from an increasing rate of criminal activity against its users. In addition to phishing, attackers exploited flaws in the Microsoft Windows operating systems and Internet Explorer web browser to collect account details from millions of computers to compromise e-gold accounts.

Jackson said that e-gold is a book entry system with account histories, making it possible to identify users who had engaged in illicit activity. e-gold accounts were pseudonymous, allowing an account's creator to use any name. However, account and transaction records—even failed log-in attempts—were permanently recorded, enabling linkage of seemingly unrelated accounts secretly under unified control. The data mining this enabled, combined with inputs from independent exchange services, allowed law enforcement to identify numerous criminal users of the service.

Fraud

The Western Express Cybercrime Group, a five-man fraud syndicate based in Eastern Europe, engaged in carding, selling illegally obtained goods and using e-gold and other digital currencies to store the proceeds. e-gold enabled criminals and hackers in Romania to move money from victims in America. Several of the cyber crime gangs that plagued and used e-gold were based in Râmnicu Vâlcea, Romania.

Prosecution and closure

In 2007, a U.S. federal grand jury indicted e-gold, accusing it of serving identity thieves and child pornographers. The company denied the charges. In July 2008, the company and its three directors entered into a plea agreement. Jackson pleaded guilty to operation of an unlicensed money transmitting business and conspiracy to engage in money laundering. In November 2008, Jackson was sentenced to 300 hours of community service, a $200 fine, and three years of supervision, including six months of electronically monitored home detention. Reid Jackson, Douglas Jackson's brother, and e-Gold director Barry Downey were each sentenced to three years of probation and 300 hours of community service, and ordered to pay a $2,500 fine and a $100 assessment. Jackson had faced a maximum sentence of 20 years in prison and a $500,000 fine. Judge Rosemary Collyer opted for a much more lenient sentence because of Jackson's significant personal debt. "Dr. Jackson has suffered, will continue to suffer, and may never be successful with e-Gold," said the judge.

e-gold's plea agreement included a forfeiture of about $1.2 million to the government, a $300,000 fine, and a condition that Jackson impose know your customer (KYC) rules on e-gold customers. Customers who lived in high-risk countries or who had not completed KYC verification were limited to low or no transaction rates. e-gold announced a claims process in December 2010, and launched it in June 2013, for account holders to access the funds they had deposited. As of November 2013, users could not use e-gold's web site for other purposes.  Jackson told the Financial Times in a November 2013 article that he had hoped to resurrect e-gold himself, but that he had not been able to obtain the licenses required in most US states.

See also
Digital currency
Digital currency exchanger
Gold as an investment
Liberty Reserve

References

External links

Digital gold currencies